This article details the qualifying phase for sailing at the 2020 Summer Olympics . 350 quota places for the Games are entitled to the sailors coming from their respective NOCs, based on the results at designated regattas supervised by World Sailing. Host nation Japan has been guaranteed one quota place in each of the ten classes.

The qualification period commences at the 2018 Sailing World Championships in Aarhus, Denmark, where about forty percent of the total quota will be awarded to the highest finishing NOCs. Six places will be available in the men's Laser and women's Laser Radial classes at the 2018 Asian Games and 2019 Pan American Games, whereas sixty-one more will be distributed to the sailors at the World Championships for all boats in 2019. Moving towards 2021 because of the consequent Olympic postponement and the COVID-19 pandemic, continental qualification regattas will be held to decide the remainder of the total quota, while two spots each in the one-person dinghy classes will be granted to eligible NOCs through the Tripartite Commission Invitation.

Timeline

Quota places
Below are the number of boats. 470, 49er, 49erFX, and Nacra 17 classes have crew of 2 people per boat.

Qualification summary

Men's events

Windsurfer – RS:X

One-person dinghy – Laser

Heavyweight one-person dinghy – Finn

Two-person dinghy – 470

Skiff – 49er

Women's events

Windsurfer – RS:X

One-person dinghy – Laser Radial

Two-person dinghy – 470

Skiff – 49er FX

Mixed events

Multihull – Nacra 17

Notes

References

Qualification for the 2020 Summer Olympics
Sailing at the 2020 Summer Olympics
2020
Impact of the COVID-19 pandemic on the 2020 Summer Olympics